Grebņova, also spelled Grebņeva, is a village in Malnava Parish, Ludza Municipality, Latvia. There is a cemetery in Grebņova, north of the village and its namesake border checkpoint.

References 

Towns and villages in Latvia
Ludza Municipality